Ligia platycephala is a species of isopod from the genus Ligia.

Description
When seen from above, L. platycephala resembles L. exotica, in the soft, weakly articulated body and the posteriorly narrowing outline at the back tropics. However, the abdomen is proportionally smaller in Ligia platycephala. Also, the L. platycephala is considerably smaller than L. exotica. In the original description, the properties of this species are described by comparing to L. exotica.

Taxonomy 
The species was originally described by W.G. van Name in 1925 by its basionym Ligyda platycephala. It is part of the genus Ligia. The type specimen is located at the American Museum of Natural History

Habitat
The habitat of this species is deadwood in damp forest.

Range 
The species' descriptions position it in Guyana. Specimens have been collected in the jungle of Kartabo. More recent observations aggregated in the Global Biodiversity Information Facility suggest that the species can also be found in Suriname, Trinidad and Tobago, and Venezuela

References

Fauna of Suriname
Woodlice
Taxa named by Willard G. Van Name
Fauna of Guyana
Fauna of Trinidad and Tobago
Fauna of Venezuela